Daphne Khoo (born 22 January 1987) is a Singaporean singer. She was a contestant in the first season of Singapore Idol, finishing up in fourth place (third runner up) during Asian Songs week. She was also host of Idol-on-Demand, an online programme for Singapore Idol. She was video-featured on Singapore youth TV station CTV. She was also one of the contestants in the television show The Dance Floor in the group Snaap!

Early life
Khoo was born in Perth, Australia, and moved to Singapore when she was eight, where she lived with her family. She has an older and a younger sister. She also studied in St Margarets Secondary School in Singapore.

Professional background
Daphne released her debut album in December 2007 titled "Desperate' featuring twelve tracks, one of which was contributed by Ling Jia Hao (Track 8 "Rescue").
She has released a few unofficial singles, and one for the Idol-based show, Shooting Stars. She was formerly the lead singer of West Grand Boulevard. She was a Mass Communications student at Ngee Ann Polytechnic's School of Film and Media Studies where she pursued a diploma. She completed her degree in communications at RMIT University in 2009 in Melbourne, Australia.

In 2010, she began studying Songwriting at Berklee College of Music in Boston, Massachusetts and graduated with a degree in Professional Music. Daphne currently resides in Los Angeles, California.

Filmography
Shooting Stars (2005) ; from Singapore Idol
The Showdown (2008) ; from Channel 5's brand new local game show

Discography

Albums
Desperate (2007)

Singles
2007: Doll
2008: Desperate
2012: Carry On
2013: Rooftops
2014: Wonderland
2015: Louder (Paul van Dyk & Roger Shah featuring Daphne Khoo)
2015: Greatest (Songs of the Games-2015 Southeast Asian Games)

References

External links

 "Haneri Catches Us Up to Speed With New Music and Graduating from “Daphne Khoo”" Popspoken. 9 July 2020. Retrieved 9 July 2020.
 

Singaporean people of Chinese descent
21st-century Singaporean women singers
Living people
1987 births
Ngee Ann Polytechnic alumni